Konso may refer to:

 Konso, town in Southern Ethiopia
 konso people, Lowland East Cushitic-speaking ethnic group primarily inhabiting south-western Ethiopia.
 Konso Zone, Zone in SNNPR
 Konso language, Lowland East Cushitic language spoken in southwest Ethiopia

Disambiguation pages